Thomas Stannus (1736–1813) was an Irish soldier and politician, of the family which later produced the celebrated dancer and choreographer Dame Ninette de Valois (born Edris Stannus).  

He was the son of Trevor Stannus of Stannus Hill, Portarlington, who held office as High Sheriff of County Louth, and Jane  Sibthorpe, daughter of Stephen Sibthorpe, MP for Louth. 

He was an Army captain, who fought in the American War of Independence and was seriously wounded. He was Escheator of Leinster in 1800. He was Member of Parliament (MP) for Portarlington from 1798 to 1800. 

He married Caroline Hamilton, one of the numerous children of James Hamilton of Sheephill Park, County Dublin, Deputy Prothonotary of the Court of King's Bench (Ireland), (whose portrait was painted by Gilbert Stuart), and sister of Hans Hamilton MP, and had eight children. His son  James was Dean of Ross, Ireland from 1830 to 1876. Another son Thomas, a soldier like his father, was the great-grandfather of Edris Stannus, better known as Ninette de Valois: her father was Colonel Thomas Stannus, DSO.

Arms

References 

1736 births
1813 deaths
Members of the Parliament of Ireland (pre-1801) for Portarlington
Irish MPs 1798–1800